RSM may refer to:

Companies 
 RSM Global, worldwide accountancy & professional services network
 RSM US, a tax, accounting and consulting firm based in Chicago
 RSM UK
 RSM Singapore
 RSM Tenon, defunct professional services network in the UK
 RSM Robson Rhodes, defunct professional services network in the UK
 Reliable Source Music, an independent production music company
 Renault Samsung Motors, a South Korean motor manufacturer

Institutions 
 Rotterdam School of Management (RSM Erasmus University), the business school of Erasmus University, Rotterdam
 Royal School of Mines, an institute of higher education in London, England
 Royal Society of Medicine, a British medical society
 Rajalakshmi School of Management, a Business School based in Chennai, Tamil Nadu, India.
 Russian School of Mathematics, an after-school mathematical education program based in Massachusetts

Locations 
 Rancho Santa Margarita, California, a city in California
 Vehicle registration plates of San Marino

Methods or models 
 Rating scale model, one of the models used in Item Response Theory
 Reciprocal Space Map, a crystallographic method
 Response surface methodology, sequential experimentation for improvement and for finding an optimal response
 Reynolds stress model, a method in Computational fluid dynamics for modeling turbulence

Other organizations 
 Radioamaterski Sojuz na Makedonija, an amateur radio organization in the Republic of Macedonia
 Religious Order of the Sisters of Mercy, an order of Catholic women
 Rete degli Studenti Medi, Italian High School and VET student union
 Russian Socialist Movement, a socialist political party in Russia
 Rassemblement Saint-Martinois, a political party in Saint Martin

Other uses 
 R. Stevie Moore (born 1952), American singer-songwriter
 Regimental Sergeant Major, a warrant officer appointment in the British and most Commonwealth armies and the Royal Marines
 Resolute Support Mission, a NATO mission in Afghanistan from the end of 2014
 Route Switch Module, a component of a powered device that provides network routing services
 Republic of San Marino, a country in southern Europe
RNA-targeting small molecule drugs, a class of small molecules, organic compounds with traditional drug properties. 
 Radio Squadron, Mobile, signal intelligence squadrons of the United States Air Force Security Service